Daniel Vahnke (born April 2, 1965), sometimes credited as Anton Rathausen, is a Canadian composer and lyricist. He is best known as a co-founding member of Vampire Rodents, a band that integrated elements of classical, ambient, and industrial music into its work. Daniel is fluent in German, Latin and Chinese, all of which are used in his compositions.

History
Before forming the band, Daniel Vahnke studied anthropology in Toronto while working on piano pieces based on Chinese character stroke analysis. After the purchase of his first Roland S-50, Daniel became fascinated with Sample Based Composition, considering it a cleaner, safer, and more efficient method of creating music. In 1988 he created Vampire Rodents with his friend Victor Wulf, who had been writing experimental pop music, as a form of entertainment. However, the band soon developed into a creative outlet for Daniel's darkly humorous lyrics as well as his somewhat Anti-human ideals.

His last commercially available project, Papa Woody, was released in 1996 under the name Ether Bunny, although it was basically a solo effort. Serving as his personal tribute to the cartoon and jazz music, Vahnke claims to have been more satisfied with his work on Papa Woody than on any Vampire Rodents album. A collaboration with Athan Maroulis called Alchemia, later renamed Obsidian, was planned for release in 1997 but never came into fruition. The overall project was described as a SBC and LTG approach to The Blue Nile with string orchestra. Also, a completely instrumental Vampire Rodent album was completed the same year, but like the Alcemia/Obsidian project was shelved indefinitely.

Personal life
To give his vocal "characters" an individual identity, he decided to work under the alias Anton Rathausen.

Although he rarely watches movies or television, Daniel remains an admirer of cartoons. His favorite films are Life of Brian, RocketMan, The Incredible Mr. Limpet, Shaun of the Dead, and Incredible Shrinking Man. However, Daniel has claimed that "Most films are best enjoyed played in reverse with several CD players playing random damaged CD's as an augmented soundtrack."

Musical style and influences
Working mostly with samples, Daniel uses a Roland S-50 and a Commodore 64 to create his music. Unlike other artists who use a similar technique, he has been noted for "tweaking and twisting originals to create something new instead of simply relying on a familiar hook for instant recognition." Although occasionally being listed as Industrial, Daniel has stated that it does not define his work, noting that he has paid very little attention to the scene.

Daniel's musical influences range from cartoon music (Milt Franklyn, Carl Stalling), impressionist music (Claude Debussy, Maurice Ravel), avant-garde (György Ligeti, Luigi Nono, Edgard Varèse), electronic (Luciano Berio, Tod Dockstader, İlhan Mimaroğlu, Karlheinz Stockhausen), classical (Johann Sebastian Bach, Igor Stravinsky), ambient (Steve Roach), as well as big band music (Benny Goodman). Vahnke has also spoken about admiring modern rock artists such as The Young Gods, Einstürzende Neubauten, Tom Waits, Sigur Rós, and The Blue Nile.

Discography

 Music for Player Piano (2018, Rodentia Productions)
 Early Soundtrack Sketches, Vol. I (2018, Rodentia Productions)
 Early Soundtrack Sketches, Vol. II (2018, Rodentia Productions)

References

External links

Living people
Place of birth missing (living people)
Canadian composers
Canadian male composers
Canadian singer-songwriters
Canadian male singers
Canadian rock singers
Canadian experimental musicians
Canadian industrial musicians
Musicians from Toronto
1965 births
Canadian male singer-songwriters